Vukota is a masculine given name and a surname. It may refer to:

Vukota Pavić (born 1993), basketball player
Mick Vukota (born 1966), ice hockey player

See also
Vukotić

Slavic masculine given names
Serbian masculine given names